Mattias Thunman Hälldahl (born  September 7, 1993) is a Swedish ice hockey defenceman. He is currently playing with Timrå IK of the Swedish Hockey League (SHL).

Thunman-Halldahl made his Elitserien (now the SHL) debut playing with Timrå IK during the 2012–13 Elitserien season.

References

External links

1993 births
Living people
Swedish ice hockey defencemen
Timrå IK players